Universiti Malaysia Kelantan (UMK) is a public university in Kelantan, Malaysia. The formation of the university was mooted during the tabling of the Ninth Malaysia Plan and approved by the cabinet of Malaysia on 14 June 2006. The launching ceremony was held at the end of 2006 by Prime Minister, Y.A.B. Tun Abdullah Ahmad Badawi. The first students were enrolled with the commencement of the June 2007 semester.

The Prime Minister of Malaysia announced the government's approval to establish a university in Kelantan under the Ninth Malaysia Plan on 31 March 2006.

On 14 June 2006, a Cabinet Meeting approved the establishment of the university. Taglines such as “Entrepreneurship is Our Thrust” and “Entrepreneurial University” are used to promote the philosophy of the university. Studies are grouped into three fields:
 Entrepreneurship and Business;
 Creative Technology and Heritage;
 Agro-Industry and Science of Natural Resources.

Apart from the three fields of study, emphasis is given to acquiring language and soft skills.

The Growth of the university
 The temporary campus of UMK at Taman Bendahara began its official operation on 1 July 2007 with the registration of 295 pioneering students. On its second year of operation, beginning July 2008, the university registered 332 students.
The first Vice-Chancellor of University Malaysia Kelantan was Prof. Dato’ Ir. Dr. Zainai bin Mohamed, who was appointed on 1 October 2006.

UMK operates in three campuses from its main campus in Bachok, second campus in Jeli and also their inaugural campus in Pengkalan Chepa, Kota Bharu.

History
The establishment of the University of Kelantan Malaysia in the state of Kelantan has been made one of the components of the 9th Malaysia Plan to support the development of quality human capital in the country's higher education sector. The Prime Minister of Malaysia, Dato' Seri Abdullah bin Haji Ahmad Badawi, has announced the government's approval to set up a university in Kelantan in the presentation of the 9th Malaysia plan on March 31, 2006.

The Cabinet approved the establishment of the Malaysian University of Kelantan at the Cabinet Meeting on 14 June 2006. In all study programs, the Cabinet has also set the curriculum framework at UMK focused on entrepreneurship education and enterprises.

This is why stimulus phrases such as Entrepreneurship are commonly used as Our Thrust and Entrepreneurial University. Specializing in short and medium term growth is divided into three areas of study: Entrepreneurship and Business; Innovative and Heritage Technology and Agro-Industry and Science of Natural Resources.

Universiti Malaysia Kelanfan is the 19th public higher learning institution founded in Malaysia and located on a temporary campus in Taman Bendahara, Pengkalan Chepa, Kota Bharu. UMK officially began operations with the enrollment of 295 senior students on 1 July 2007.

The University of Kelantan Malaysia was firstly located at Kota Bharu Technology Institute, Kota Bharu, Kelantan. Professor Dato' Ir. Dr. Zainai Mohamed has been named as Universiti Malaysia Kelantan's first vice-chancellor, effective 1 October 2006.

First Convocation
UMK's first convocation was held from 15 to 19 September 2011 at the Bachok Campus in Bachok, Kelantan.

266 first graduates of UMK from the Faculty of Agro Industry and Natural Resources (42 people); Faculty of Entrepreneurship and Business (83 persons) and the Faculty of Creative Technology and Heritage (141 people) received a bachelor's degree of their  faculties at the First Convocation of UMK which was held at a hotel in Kota Bharu, Kelantan on 19 September 2011.

Among the degrees awarded are: Bachelor of Entrepreneurship (Commerce) with Honours, Bachelor of Applied Science (Agriculture Technology Entrepreneurship) With Honours, Bachelor of Creative Technology with Honours, and Bachelor of Heritage Studies with Honours.
One post-graduate student was awarded master's degree of Entrepreneurship (Management) and two with master's degree of Science (Agriculture Biotechnology). (Faculty of Veterinary Medicine had their first batch of graduates on 2014.)

UMK awarded an Honorary Degree of Doctor of Entrepreneurship (Human Capital Development) to the fifth Prime Minister of Malaysia, Tun Haji Abdullah Ahmad Badawi.

UMK simultaneously held the Proclamation ceremony of His Royal Highness Tuanku Chancellor, Sultan Muhammad V, the Sultan and Yang Di-Pertuan for the state of Kelantan Darul Naim as the Chancellor of UMK, and the appointment of His Royal Highness Dr. Tengku Muhammad Faiz Petra Ibni Sultan Ismail Petra, who is the Crown Prince of Kelantan as the Pro-Chancellor of UMK was held.

UMK introduced the logo of convocation which uses the colours of UMK; blue, orange and red.

UMK first graduates have become the first alumni, thus, a song titled "Detik Ini" was created by the university as a memento for them.

Vice-chancellors

Facilities
UMK has three campuses in the state of Kelantan:
  Pengkalan Chepa Campus (Kampus Kota)
  Bachok Campus (Kampus Bachok)
  Jeli Campus (Kampus Jeli)

These facilities can be found on each campus:
 Hostel
 Library
 Database Centre. As an alternative source of information for users, the library has a central database for information that can be accessed through the internet. The Database Centre has 26 thin client terminals for users.
Self Check Out Terminal The library has a self check-out terminal to provide a smooth and quick means of borrowing library materials.
 Book Drop Library users can return library materials through the book drop counter that operates at all times.
Database. The library has academic databases that can be used to access research material and other publications.
 Shuttle Bus
 Clinic
 Sports and cultural facilities
 Cafeteria
 Surau
 Security guards
All doors have an Access Control System that uses cards to gain access.
 Computer Lab
 Counselling Centre
 Language Lab (recently available in Pengkalan Chepa campus) 
 Spa Lab (only in Pengkalan Chepa campus)
 Science Laboratory (only in Jeli campus)
Biology Lab
Chemistry Lab
Materials Science Lab
Food Lab
Environmental Lab
Geoscience Lab
Mineralogy Lab
Husbandry Lab
Natural Resources Lab
 Multipurpose Hall
 Wireless internet access throughout campus

Academic programs and courses
UMK offers the following programs:

Faculty of Earth Science [FSB]

Undergraduate degrees
 Bachelor of applied science

 Geoscience (SEG)
 Sustainable Science (SEL)
 Natural Resources (SEN)

Postgraduate degrees
 Master of Science
 Natural Resources Management
Environmental Sustainable
Environment Technology
Applied Remote Sensing and GIS
Geological Sciences

Faculty of Agro-Based Industry [FIAT]

Undergraduate degrees
 Bachelor of Applied Science

 Product Development Technology (SBP)
 Husbandary Science (SBH)
 Agrotechnology  (SBS)
Food security (SBF)

Postgraduate degrees
 Master Of Science
Agro-Entrepreneurship
Bioindustrial Technology
Agricultural Biotechnology
Natural Resources Management
Environmental Sustainable
Environment Technology
Animal Sciences
Plant Sciences
Applied Remote Sensing and GIS
Aquaculture
Geological Sciences
Product development
Aquatic Animal Health
 Doctor Of Philosophy

Agricultural Microbiology
Bioprocess Technology
Bioindustrial Technology
Mathematics
Agro-Entrepreneurship
Natural Resources Science
Microbial Technology
Food Biotechnology
Aquaculture
Aquatic Animal Health
Geological Sciences
 Product development

Faculty of Bioengineering and Technology [FBKT]

undergraduate degrees 

 Bachelor of applied science
 Bioindustrial technology (SBT)
 Material science (SEB)
 Forest resources technology (SEH)

Faculty of Entrepreneurship & Business [FKP]

Undergraduate degrees
 Bachelor of Entrepreneurship (SAE)

 Commerce (SAK)
 Health Entrepreneurship (SAW)
 Islamic Banking and Finance (SAB)
 Retailing (SAR)
 Logistic and Distribution (SAL)

Postgraduate degrees
 Master of Entrepreneurship
 Accounting
 Commerce
 Finance
 Management
 Retailing
 Tourism
 Hospitality
 Health Entrepreneurship
 Doctor of Philosophy

Faculty of Hospitality,Tourism and Wellness [FHPK]

Undergraduate degrees 

 Bachelor of entrepreneurship 
 Tourism
 Hospitality
 Health Entrepreneurship

Postgraduate degrees 

 Master of entrepreneurship
 Tourism
 Hospitality
 Health Entrepreneurship
 Doctor of philosophy 
 Tourism
 Hospitality
 Health Entrepreneurship

Faculty of Heritage & Creative Technology [FTKW]

Undergraduate degrees
 Bachelor of Heritage Studies
 Heritage Conservation
 Performing Arts
 Heritage Literature
 Cultural Heritage
 Bachelor of Creative Technology
 Multimedia
 Animation
 Screen Study
 Visual Communication
 Fine Arts
 Industrial Design
 Fashion and Textile

Postgraduate degrees
 Master of Arts
 Heritage Studies
 Multimedia
 Product Design
 Textile and Fashion
 Visual Communications
 Doctor of Philosophy

Faculty of Architecture and Ekistics [FAE]

Undergraduate degrees 

 Bachelor of Science in Architecture 
 Bachelor of Interior Architecture
 Bachelor of Landscape Architecture

Postgraduate degrees 

 Master of art architectural history and theory 
 Doctor of philosophy architectural history and theory

Faculty of Veterinary Medicine [FPV]

Undergraduate degrees
 Doctor of Veterinary Medicine

Postgraduate degrees
 Master of Veterinary Medicine(Full-time research mode):
 Pathology
 Nutrition
 Anatomy
 Microbiology
 Parasitology
 Physiology
 Doctor of Philosophy in Veterinary Medicine

Faculty for Language Studies and Generic Development [FBI]

Undergraduate degrees
 Bachelor of Business Communication with English (Honours)
 Bachelor of Arabic Language with Enterpreneurship (Honours)

Postgraduate degrees

 Master of Arts
 History and Civilisation
 Development and Educational Values
 Philosophy and Social Development
 Religion and Contemporary
 Language and Education Studies
 Communication
 Islamic Studies
 Doctor of Philosophy
 History and Civilisation
 Development and Educational Values
 Philosophy and Social Development
 Religion and Contemporary
 Language and Education Studies
 Communication
 Islamic Studies

Centre

Centre for Language Studies & Generic Development

English language
 English language
 English for Sciences
 English for Business Communications
 English For Creativity Writing In Arts And Heritage

Third languages
 Arabic
 Mandarin
 Thai
 Japanese
 German
 Spanish
 French
(Khmer and Vietnamese were offered before.)

Social sciences
 Islamic and Asian Civilisation
 Ethnic Relations
 Malaysian Nationhood & Development
 Philosophy
 Moral and Professional Ethics
 Critical Thinking and Communication Skills

Co-curricular activities like participation in sports teams are also recognised as academic courses and are invigilated by the Centre for Language Studies and Human Development.
(***):Short cut and nickname for the faculty or course.

Centre for graduated studies

Malaysian Graduate school of Entrepreneurship and Business

UMK Centre for External Education

Entrepreneur

Institute of Small and Medium Entreprise [ISME]

Universiti Malaysia Kelantan Institute [UMKEI]

Global Entrepreneurship Research and Innovation Centre

Pengkalan Chepa campus (City Campus)
The campus is expected to operate until the enrolment reaches 2,160 students. Starting from September 2011, the students will be placed at mainly Bachok and Jeli according to the faculty.

Campus facilities
Total area

Taman Bendahara - 10,600m2
Hostel - 10,530m2

This campus consists of:
 Faculty of Entrepreneurship & Business (FKP)
 Faculty of Veterinary Medicine (FPV)
 Centre for Language Studies & Generic Development (PPBPI)
 Institute of Small & Medium Enterprises (ISME)
 Centre for Academic Development & Management (PPPA)
 Corporate Relations Centre
 Library
 The Chancellery
 Registrar's Department
 Division of Academic Affairs
 Bursary
 Department of Information & Communication Technology
 Department of Infra & Services Development
 Lecture Halls
 Lecture Rooms
 Student Activity Rooms
 Studios
 Science, Computer and Language Labs
 Cafeteria
 Surau
 Clinic
 Student Enterprise Centre

Bachok Campus
Universiti Malaysia Kelantan or UMK is a university in the state of Kelantan and is the country's 19th state university. It is located in the Bachok district, near the tourist area of the Tok Bali beach. UMK began operating officially on 1 September 2006. The campus covers an area of 553.8 acres and is being developed in two phases with the first phase covering an area of 254 acres with the other phase occupying the remaining 300 acres of landscape in the future. Part of the campus is made up of a former paddy plantation which is suitable for development. The area is surrounded by schools, villages and a technical skills development institute.

The campus is divided into eight zones with the First Phase containing the commercial, academic, public spaces and residential zones; whereas the Second Phase will incorporate a sports complex, a park, a staff residential complex, a commercial zone and a Wetland Park.

The main entrance to the campus under the First Phase is through the P2 door with the UMK mosque minaret as the main focus point. The building layout of the campus is pedestrian-friendly, with the buildings being separated from each other at a distance of 400 meters.

The First Phase of the development involves the entrepreneurship and business faculty, the arts faculty, the university's language centre, the academic administration building, lecture halls and rooms, the administrative building, public spaces; and the Islamic centre and the mosque. This phase currently houses around 2,160 undergraduates and 500 campus staff. The Bachok campus of UMK will be later transformed into a park campus.

Jeli Campus
The Faculty of Agro Industry and Natural Resources was stationed at UMK Taman Bendahara in Pengkalan Chepa until 19 January 2012. The faculty has moved to the new campus in Gemang, Jeli. The campus is located on 270 acres that includes the department of sciences and technology of FASA as well as the administrative office. In April 2012, FASA was dissolved and two new faculties were formed. They are the Faculty of Agro-based Industry and Faculty of Earth Sciences with a total of 900 undergraduates and postgraduates students. There are 74 academic staff of which 41 academic staff are on study leave, 55 non academic staff and 12 international academic staff.

For the September 2012 intake, students’ enrolment is expected to increase to 1500 students for seven undergraduate academic programmes and postgraduate programmes. There is only one building in the campus which is shared with the two faculties and the administrative office. The campus has a hall, library and hostels for the students. Due to the fact that there is only one building for the administration and academic purposes, the Faculty of Veterinary Medicine has to remain at UMK Padang Tembak. The faculty will move to UMK Jeli soon.

The first batch of FASA of 42 students graduated during the last convocation ceremony in September 2011.

See also
 List of universities in Malaysia

References

External links

 Universiti Malaysia Kelantan

Universities and colleges in Kelantan
Public universities in Malaysia
Educational institutions established in 2007
2007 establishments in Malaysia
Technical universities and colleges in Malaysia